The Continental Cup 2009–10 was the 13th edition of the IIHF Continental Cup. The season started on September 25, 2009, and finished on January 15, 2010.

The tournament was won by Red Bull Salzburg, who led the final group.

The points system used in this tournament was: the winner in regular time won 3 points, the loser 0 points; in case of a tie, an overtime and a penalty shootout is played, the winner in penalty shootouts or overtime won 2 points and the loser won 1 point.

First Group Stage

Group A
(Ankara, Turkey)

Group A standings

Second Group Stage

Group B
(Miercurea Ciuc, Romania)

Group B standings

Group C
(Kraków, Poland)

Group C standings

 Sheffield Steelers,
 HDK Maribor,
 HC Bolzano,
 Red Bull Salzburg,
 Sokil Kiev,
 Liepājas Metalurgs :  bye

Third Group Stage

Group D
(Bolzano, Italy)

Group D standings

Group E
(Liepāja, Latvia)

Group E standings

 Grenoble Brûleurs de Loups,
 Yunost Minsk     :  bye

Final stage

Final Group
(Grenoble, France)

Final Group standings

References
 Official IIHF tournament page

2009–10 in European ice hockey
IIHF Continental Cup